John S. Stephans (May 2, 1921 – February 10, 1984) was an American professional basketball player. He played in the National Basketball League in one game for the Pittsburgh Raiders during the 1944–45 season. He scored four points in his lone appearance.

References

1921 births
1984 deaths
American men's basketball players
United States Navy personnel of World War II
Basketball players from Pittsburgh
Guards (basketball)
Pittsburgh Raiders players
United States Navy sailors